Coco Point Lodge Airstrip  is a private use airport located near Coco Point, Barbuda, Antigua and Barbuda.

See also
List of airports in Antigua and Barbuda

References

External links 
 Airport record for Coco Point Lodge Airstrip at Landings.com

Airports in Antigua and Barbuda
Airports in Barbuda